"See the Lights" is the second single released from Scottish rock band Simple Minds' 10th studio album, Real Life. Written by band members Charlie Burchill and Jim Kerr, the song is about missing someone and a depression that accompanies it, longing to bring back the love that is dying. Released on 13 May 1991, the song was a top 40 hit in six countries. It reached number 20 in the UK, number 10 in Canada, and number 40 in the United States. It also went to number one on the US Billboard Modern Rock chart and number 10 on the US Mainstream Rock chart. It was Simple Minds' fifth song to reach the top 40 in the US, and was the last to do so.

Charts

References

1991 singles
1991 songs
Simple Minds songs
Song recordings produced by Stephen Lipson